The Roman Catholic Diocese of Newport (and Menevia) was the Latin Catholic precursor (1840-1916) in Wales and southwest England of the present Roman Catholic Archdiocese of Cardiff, with see in Newport, Wales, and was revived as Latin titular see.

History 
 Established in 1840 as Apostolic Vicariate of the Welsh District, on Anglo-Welsh territories (the whole of Wales and the English county of Herefordshire) canonically split off from the Apostolic Vicariate of the Western District.
 Elevated on 29 September 1850 as Diocese of Newport and Menevia, a suffragan in the ecclesiastical province of the Roman Catholic Archdiocese of Birmingham, having lost northern, English territory to establish the Roman Catholic Diocese of Shrewsbury. It had its pro-cathedral at Belmont Abbey in Herefordshire (England), built from 15 February 1854 by Francis Richard Wegg-Prosser, a landowner converted in 1852, followed by Benedictine monastic buildings from 1857, since 21 November 1859 a priory, on 4 September 1860 is consecrated as the cathedral priory  The abbey continues to be enlarged (chancel extended in 1865).
 Renamed on 4 July 1895 as Diocese of Newport (Latin Neoportus), having lost further (Welsh) territory to establish the Apostolic Vicariate of Wales, covering Glamorgan, Monmouth (both Welsh) and Herefordshire (England).
 Suppressed on 7 February 1916, its canonical territory being used to establish the Metropolitan Roman Catholic Archdiocese of Cardiff.

Episcopal ordinaries
(all Roman Rite, both born in England)

Apostolic Vicar of the Welsh District 
 Thomas Joseph Brown, Benedictine Order (O.S.B.) (1840.06.05 – 1850.09.29 see below), Titular Bishop of Apollonia (1840.06.05 – 1850.09.29)

Suffragan Bishops of Newport and Menevia
 Thomas Joseph Brown, O.S.B. (1850.09.29 – death 1880.04.12)
 John Cuthbert Hedley, O.S.B. (1881.02.18 – 1895 see below), succeeding as previous 
Auxiliary Bishop of Newport and Menevia (1873.07.22 – 1881.02.18) and Titular Bishop of Cæsaropolis (1873.07.22 – 1881.02.18)

Suffragan Bishops of Newport 
 John Cuthbert Hedley, O.S.B. (see above 1895 – death 1915.11.11).

Titular see 
The pre-Cardiff diocese was nominally restored in 1969 as Titular bishopric of Newport (Latin Neoportus).

It has had the following incumbents, of the fitting episcopal (lowest) rank, with an archiepiscopal exception :
 Titular Archbishop Fulton John Sheen (1969.10.06 – death 1979.12.09), as emeritate; previously Titular Bishop of Cæsariana (1951.05.28 – 1966.10.21) as Auxiliary Bishop of New York (NY, USA) (1951.05.28 – 1966.10.21), Bishop of Rochester (USA) (1966.10.21 – retired 1969.10.06)
 Howard George Tripp (1979.12.20 – death 2022.10.03), as Auxiliary Bishop of Southwark (England) (1979.12.20 – emeritate 2004.01.07).

References

Sources and external links 
 GCatholic - titular see 

Catholic titular sees in Europe
Former Roman Catholic dioceses in England